Pauline Hanson's One Nation – New South Wales, also known as One Nation – New South Wales or simply One Nation NSW, is the New South Wales branch of Pauline Hanson's One Nation.

It is led by Mark Latham, a member of the New South Wales Legislative Council.

History
In 2017, NSW One Nation published its party constitution.

In 2018, former Labor leader Mark Latham joined One Nation as the party's leader in New South Wales.

At the 2019 state election, One Nation won two seats on the Legislative Council, which were won by Mark Latham and Rod Roberts.

For the 2023 state election, the party announced it would contest in more electorates. Outgoing MP for Bankstown Tania Mihailuk joined One Nation and will contest the Legislative Council. Mark Latham will also contest the Legislative Council again.

Election results

Policies
One Nation NSW supports:
 Parental rights in schools
 Performance pay for teachers
 The usage of multiple energy sources, including fossil fuels, nuclear power and renewable energy
 Property rights for farmers

One Nation NSW opposes:
 The teaching of critical race theory, gender theory and the Safe Schools program
 Lowering the age of criminal responsibility
 The Independent Planning Commission

Members of parliament
 Mark Latham MLC (2019–present)
 Tania Mihailuk MP (Bankstown, 2023)
 Rod Roberts MLC (2019–present)

References

External links
 Official website

 

New South Wales
Political parties in New South Wales